Steve Orlen (January 13, 1942 – November 16, 2010) was an American poet and professor at the University of Arizona. He was visiting professor at the University of Houston, Goddard College, and Warren Wilson College. Orlen was a co-founder of the Creative Writing Program at the University of Arizona and a 1967 graduate of the Iowa Writers' Workshop.

Awards
 1999 Guggenheim Fellow
 National Endowment for the Arts fellow.

Works
Permission to Speak, Wesleyan University Press, 1978, 
A Place at the Table, Holt, Rinehart, and Winston, 1982
The Bridge of Sighs, Miami University Press, 1992, 
Kisses, Miami University Press, 1997, 

 A Thousand Threads, Hollyridge Press, 2009,   Chapbook

Anthologies

References

External links
In Memory of Steve Orlen (1942-2010) by Jerry Williams
http://isak.typepad.com/isak/2010/11/remembering-steve-orlen-1942-2010.html
http://avoidmuse.blogspot.com/2010/11/rip-steve-orlen.html
http://cat.middlebury.edu/~nereview/31-4/Collier.htm

1942 births
2010 deaths
American male poets
University of Arizona faculty
20th-century American poets
20th-century American male writers